Emilio Valle (born 21 April 1967, in Sancti Spíritus) is a Cuban retired hurdler.

His personal best time was 13.18 seconds, achieved in the semi final at the 1996 Summer Olympics in Atlanta. The result places him third among Cuban 110 m hurdlers, behind Anier García and Dayron Robles.

International competitions

1Representing the Americas

References

External links

Profile at Sporting Heroes

1967 births
Living people
People from Sancti Spíritus
Cuban male hurdlers
Olympic athletes of Cuba
Athletes (track and field) at the 1992 Summer Olympics
Athletes (track and field) at the 1996 Summer Olympics
Pan American Games medalists in athletics (track and field)
Pan American Games silver medalists for Cuba
Athletes (track and field) at the 1995 Pan American Games
World Athletics Championships athletes for Cuba
Universiade medalists in athletics (track and field)
Goodwill Games medalists in athletics
Central American and Caribbean Games gold medalists for Cuba
Competitors at the 1990 Central American and Caribbean Games
Competitors at the 1993 Central American and Caribbean Games
Competitors at the 1998 Central American and Caribbean Games
Universiade silver medalists for Cuba
Central American and Caribbean Games medalists in athletics
Medalists at the 1989 Summer Universiade
Competitors at the 1994 Goodwill Games
Medalists at the 1995 Pan American Games
World Athletics U20 Championships winners
20th-century Cuban people